Kolonia Wola Solecka  is a village in the administrative district of Gmina Chotcza, within Lipsko County, Masovian Voivodeship, in east-central Poland.

The village has an approximate population of 150.

References

Kolonia Wola Solecka